The New School is a New York City university.

New School may also refer to:

Educational institutions
 The New School of Northern Virginia, United States
 The New School Foundation, Norway
 NewSchool of Architecture and Design, California, United States
 The New School, a Waldorf school originally in London, later renamed Michael Hall

Other uses
 The New School (album), by The Tough Alliance
 New school hip hop, a period in hip hop music
 Newschool skiing
 New school (tattoo), a style and movement in tattooing.
 New School Presbyterians, a US Christian denomination existing after the 1837 Old School–New School Controversy and the remerger with the Old School Presbyterians after ~1870.